"Cutie Pie" is a song performed by One Way, issued as the second single from their album Who's Foolin' Who. The song was the band's only appearance on the Billboard Hot 100, peaking at #61 in 1982.

Chart positions

References

1982 singles
MCA Records singles
One Way (American band) songs
1982 songs